Stevie Wonder Presents: Syreeta is the second studio album by American singer and songwriter Syreeta Wright, released by Motown on June 19, 1974.

Track listing
Side one
"I'm Goin' Left" (Stevie Wonder, Syreeta Wright) (3:36)
"Spinnin' and Spinnin'" (Wonder, Wright) (4:21)
"Your Kiss Is Sweet" (Wonder, Wright) (4:31)
"Come and Get This Stuff" (Wonder) (3:38)
"Heavy Day" (Wonder, Wright) (4:00)
Side two
"Cause We've Ended as Lovers" (Wonder) (4:30)
"Just a Little Piece of You" (Wonder, Wright) (4:01)
"Waitin' for the Postman" (Wonder) (1:47)
"When Your Daddy's Not Around" (Wonder) (1:03)
"I Wanna Be by Your Side" (Wonder) (with G.C. Cameron) (4:04)
"Universal Sound of the World (Your Kiss Is Sweet)" (Wonder, Wright) (4:06)

Personnel
Syreeta Wright, Stevie Wonder, Dennis Morrison, G.C. Cameron - lead vocals
Marlo Henderson, Michael Sembello - guitar
Reggie McBride - bass
Ollie E. Brown - drums
Denny Morouse - tenor saxophone
Steve Madaio - trumpet
Anita Sherman, Deniece Williams, Lani Groves, Minnie Riperton, Shirley Brewer - backing vocals
Paul Riser - string arrangements

Reception

The album received a rating of 4.5 out of 5 on AllMusic.

Charts

Trivia
Three artists who performed on this album (Stevie Wonder, Deniece Williams, Michael Sembello) would all have Billboard number one songs ("I Just Called to Say I Love You", "Let's Hear It for the Boy", and "Maniac", respectively) within a year of each other, a decade after this album's release. Another artist on this album, Ollie Brown of Ollie & Jerry, would have a Billboard top ten single, "Breakin'... There's No Stopping Us", in the same one-year period.

The song "Come and Get This Stuff" was originally intended for Rufus, but lead singer Chaka Khan refused to perform the song. Instead, Wonder wrote "Tell Me Something Good" for them which appeared on their album Rags to Rufus.

References

External links
 Syreeta-Stevie Wonder Presents Syreeta  at Discogs

1974 albums
Syreeta albums
Motown albums
Albums produced by Stevie Wonder
albums arranged by Paul Riser